Krug Park Place Historic District is a national historic district located at St. Joseph, Missouri. The district encompasses 28 contributing buildings and 1 contributing site in a predominantly residential section of St. Joseph. It developed between about 1888 and 1938, and includes representative examples of Italianate, Queen Anne, Colonial Revival, Tudor Revival, and American Craftsman style architecture. Notable buildings include the Henry Krug, Jr. House (1892) designed by architect Edmond Jacques Eckel (1845–1934),`A.V. Schaeffer House (1913), W.W. Van Sant House (1914), J.G. Schneider House (1899) by Eckel, Benton Quick House (1901), Mrs. W.B. Watkins House (1903), and George Ward House (c. 1857).

It was listed on the National Register of Historic Places in 2002.

References

Historic districts on the National Register of Historic Places in Missouri
Italianate architecture in Missouri
Queen Anne architecture in Missouri
Colonial Revival architecture in Missouri
Tudor Revival architecture in Missouri
Historic districts in St. Joseph, Missouri
National Register of Historic Places in Buchanan County, Missouri